The Bukit Batu Lebah Recreational Forest is a recreational forest located within the Bukit Senggeh Forest Reserve in Jasin District in the Malaysian state of Malacca. It offers recreational activities such as hiking and caving/cave exploration.

See also
 Geography of Malaysia
 List of tourist attractions in Malacca

References

Forests of Malaysia
Jasin District
Tourist attractions in Malacca